Turkey Run may refer to:

Claude Moore Colonial Farm, a U.S. park recreating a 1771 era tenant farm
Turkey Run (Shellpot Creek tributary), a stream in New Castle County, Delaware
Turkey Run (West Branch Susquehanna River), in Lycoming County, Pennsylvania

Protected areas
Turkey Run State Park in Indiana
Turkey Run Wildlife Management Area in West Virginia